The Chandrasekhar number is a dimensionless quantity used in magnetic convection to represent ratio of the Lorentz force to the viscosity. It is named after the Indian astrophysicist Subrahmanyan Chandrasekhar.

The number's main function is as a measure of the magnetic field, being proportional to the square of a characteristic magnetic field in a system.

Definition 

The Chandrasekhar number is usually denoted by the letter , and is motivated by a dimensionless form of the Navier-Stokes equation in the presence of a magnetic force in the equations of magnetohydrodynamics:

 

The Chandrasekhar number is thus defined as:

  

It is related to the Hartmann number, by the relation:

See also
Rayleigh number
Taylor number

References

Chandrasekhar number
Magnetohydrodynamics
Dimensionless numbers of fluid mechanics
Fluid dynamics
Astrophysics